Preisinger (German and Swiss German: habitational name for someone from Preising in Bavaria or Austria) is a surname. Notable people with the surname include:

Michael Preisinger (born 1962), German journalist, author, and TV host
Miroslav Preisinger (born 1991), Slovak ice hockey player
Sándor Preisinger (born 1973), Hungarian footballer

See also
Presinger

German toponymic surnames
Surnames of Austrian origin
Surnames of German origin